Forgues is a surname. Notable people with the surname include:

Christopher Forgues (born 1979), American artist and musician
Fernand Forgues (1884–1973), French rower and rugby union player
Matthew Forgues (born 1992), American racewalker
Pierre Forgues (born 1938), French politician
Pierre Marie Laurent Forgues (1761–?), French soldier
Sandra Forgues (born 1969), French slalom canoeist

See also
Suzette Forgues Halasz (1918–2004), Canadian musician